Eudes Archambaud was a French nobleman. 

Eudes was the son of William of Blois and Agnes of Sully.

The two brothers of Eudes, Ralph and Henry both entered the church, leaving Eudes as sole secular son and successor to their parents' holdings.
 
Lord Eudes was married to Matilda of Baugency and the couple had three sons:
Gilles III of Sully, successor of his father 
Henry de Sully, Archbishop of Bourges
Eudes de Sully, Bishop of Paris

References

Sources

 House of Blois
Lords of Sully
House of Sully